No One Deserves to Be Here More Than Me is a full-length LP released by Philadelphia hardcore band Blacklisted on Deathwish Inc. on December 1, 2009. Initially, the record was released only on vinyl that came packaged with a download card. The LP was announced the day of its release on the Deathwish E-Store. The CD version includes three bonus tracks that can also be found on the band's Eccentrichine EP.

Track listing
All tracks by Blacklisted

Personnel 

Will Yip – Engineer
Will Yip  – Mastering, Mixing
Violin by Josh Agran on “Our Apartment Is Always Empty”
Trumpet by Oskar Kalinowski on “G.E.H.”
Trumpet by Oskar Kalinowski and Colin McGinnis on “I’m Trying To Disappear”
Rainstick by David Walling on “I Am Extraordinary”
Additional vocals by Melissa Farley on “I Am Extraordinary”

References

External links
Deathwish Estore
Deathwish, Inc.

2009 albums
Blacklisted (band) albums
Deathwish Inc. albums